Rich as in Spirit is the debut studio album by American rapper Rich Homie Quan. It was released on March 16, 2018, by Motown Records. The album has been supported by two singles: "Changed" and "34". It features a sole guest appearance from rapper Rick Ross.

Background 
In February 2017, it was announced that Rich Homie Quan has signed a record deal with Motown Records, after that he released the mixtape, Back to the Basics. On March 2, 2018, the album cover, release date and tracklist was revealed.

Promotion

Singles
The album's lead single, "Changed", was released on December 15, 2017. A music video was released on February 5, 2018.

The album's second single "34" was released on February 23, 2018.

Promotional singles
The album's promotional single, "The Author" was released on March 2, 2018.

The second promotional single, "Understood" was released on March 9, 2018.

Commercial performance 
Rich as in Spirit debuted at number thirty-two on the US Billboard 200, earning 13,844 album-equivalent units of which 3,512 were in pure album sales in its first week of release.

Track listing
Credits adapted from Tidal

Charts

References 

2018 debut albums
Rich Homie Quan albums
Motown albums
Albums produced by Zaytoven